The Technion Faculty of Aerospace Engineering is a division of the Technion that conduct research and teaches a wide range of aerospace disciplines. The faculty was founded in 1954.

History
The early 1950s sought a need for a center of aeronautical research in Israel. In 1950, Sydney Goldstein accepted the chairmanship of the department of mathematics at Technion. The faculty was established in 1954 after Goldstein persuaded the President of the Technion, Yaakov Dori, and Prime Minister David Ben Gurion. The department expanded and developed rapidly, along with the development of the aerospace industry in Israel. After the Six-Day War, the faculty expanded and increased its research in airborne systems in affiliation with Rafael Advanced Defense Systems.

Facilities
The Aerospace Research Center consists of an Aerodynamics Laboratory, an Aerospace Structures Laboratory, a Combustion and Rocket Propulsion Laboratory, a Turbo and Jet Engine Laboratory, a Flight Control Laboratory, and the Design for Manufacturing Laboratory.

See also
 Asher Space Research Institute
 Technion – Israel Institute of Technology

References

External links
Faculty's Website

Technion – Israel Institute of Technology
Educational institutions established in 1954
1954 establishments in Israel